Francesco de Martino (31 May 1907 – 18 November 2002) was an Italian jurist, politician, lifetime senator (1991–2002) and former Vice President of the Council of Ministers. He was considered by many to be the conscience of the Italian Socialist Party.

Biography
De Martino was born on May 31, 1907 in Naples, Italy. He graduated from the law school Federico II in Naples, and, under the guidance of Enrico De Nicola, embarked on the study of law and economics and became a distinguished scholar of Roman law.

Emeritus Professor of law at the law school Federico II in Naples, he published several tomes, among which, the History of the Roman Constitution (in six tomes, which was compared for his monumental significance to the "Staatsrecht" by Theodor Mommsen) and the Economic History of Ancient Rome; his publications were translated in English, Spanish, German, French and Chinese.

He first joined the Action Party (an anti-fascist political party) in 1943, and then joined the reconstituted Socialist party in 1945.

At the first elections of the new Italian Republic in 1948, he was elected to Parliament with the Popular Front alliance of communists and socialists. He soon won the confidence of party leader Pietro Nenni, to whom he became vice secretary. In 1959 Nenni would entrust De Mortino with leading the socialist magazine Mondoperaio.

De Martino served as Deputy Prime Minister during the Rumor I, Rumor III, and Colombo governments.

De Martino was for two times the PSI's candidate to the presidential elections, in 1971 and 1978. This time, however, the more popular socialist, the former Speaker of the Chamber of Deputies, Sandro Pertini was elected. De Martino candidacy was tarnished when the family paid a 1bn lire ransom for his release his son Guido who was kidnapped by the Camorra for 40 days. The kidnappers were eventually captured, but those behind them were never discovered.

In 1976, he was ousted as party secretary by Bettino Craxi when the PSI lost in the elections falling below 10% for the second time. De Martino became the scapegoat, and Craxi became Italy's first socialist Prime Minister in 1983.

Nonetheless, he continued to be elected to the Parliament, and, on June 1, 1991, was appointed senator for life. After this appointment he joined the post-communist Democrats of the Left. He was dismayed by the demise of the historical socialist party after the corruption under Craxi.

He resumed his academic career at the law school Federico II, where his secular funeral was celebrated in the presence of the President of Italy, Carlo Azeglio Ciampi.
 
De Martino died in Naples on November 18, 2002. He is survived by his children, Armando, Guido, Antonino, Elisa and Laura.

References

External links
 
 Italian Senate Page
 Italian Parliament Page

1907 births
2002 deaths
Jurists from Naples
Deputy Prime Ministers of Italy
Candidates for President of Italy
University of Naples Federico II alumni
Italian life senators
Deputies of Legislature I of Italy
Deputies of Legislature II of Italy
Deputies of Legislature III of Italy
Deputies of Legislature IV of Italy
Deputies of Legislature V of Italy
Deputies of Legislature VI of Italy
Deputies of Legislature VII of Italy
Deputies of Legislature VIII of Italy
Senators of Legislature IX of Italy
Senators of Legislature X of Italy
Senators of Legislature XI of Italy
Senators of Legislature XII of Italy
Senators of Legislature XIII of Italy
Senators of Legislature XIV of Italy
Italian Socialist Party politicians
Action Party (Italy) politicians
Democratic Party of the Left politicians
Academic staff of the University of Naples Federico II
Italian male journalists
20th-century Italian journalists
Politicians from Naples
20th-century Italian male writers